Rustie (born Russell Whyte) is a Scottish musician from Glasgow. He is associated with the Numbers label collective and first received attention for his 2007 EP Jagz the Smack. He signed to Warp Records in 2009. His 2011 debut album Glass Swords won him widespread acclaim. His music blends disparate genres, including hip hop, rave, and video game music.

History
Rustie's first instrument was guitar and he bought his first decks at age 15. He is associated with the subgenre of aquacrunk, a genre described as an experimental offshoot of hip hop that emphasises slowed down, low-slung beats, with lashings of electronic mutterings and morphing basslines. He believes his work conveys movement and fluidity, and that his creative process is an "immersive world" wrapped up in sound, rhythm, and color. Rustie's long-time interest in video games has influenced his approach to electronic composition.

Rustie's first singles were released in 2007 and 2008. The producer signed with Warp Records in 2010 for the release of Sunburst EP. In 2011, Rustie released his first album Glass Swords on Warp Records. Widely celebrated for its meditation on everything from grime and hip-hop, to sci-fi computer games, and even prog rock, Brad LaBonte of Dusted Magazine wrote "Glass Swords contains some of the freshest, most exciting electronic dance music I've heard this year. Put simply, nothing sounds like this record." Where as Rolling Stone proclaimed it "one of the most thrilling electronic albums of the decade."

In 2012, "After Light" from Glass Swords was included in an Adidas television advertisement featuring British track and field athlete Jessica Ennis prior to the 2012 Olympic Games. Three tracks from Glass Swords ("After Light", "Ultra Thizz" and "Surph") were used in the soundtrack to the video game Sleeping Dogs.

The same year, Glass Swords won The Guardian'''s First Album Award.

Rustie released his second album, Green Language, on 26 August 2014 on Warp Records.  In a review of the album, Pitchfork proclaimed that “Part of Rustie's genius is the way he spun so many sounds and ideas into a bright, high-energy electro-funk whose central contradiction—brittle in sound, pliant in structure—turned out to be visionary." Two tracks from the album, 'Raptor' and 'Attak (feat. Danny Brown)', received "best new track" awards by Pitchfork. Following the release, a second single, "Lost" (feat. Redinho), was premiered by Zane Lowe on BBC Radio 1.

After a show for XOYO Loves at London's Coronet Theatre on 29 November 2014 featuring special guest, rapper Danny Brown, Rustie announced his upcoming 2015, 'Green Language Live' world tour. The 'Green Language' tour is his largest to date and featured dates across Europe, Australia, the USA and Korea. The events showcased immersive 3D visuals by A-Rock including lost Egyptian artefacts, swarms of birds amongst other extravagant effects.

Previously, Whyte has played live with collaborators; Redinho at his album launch party hosted at London's Oval Space on 18 September 2014, production/vocal duo AlunaGeorge, and Koreless.

On 6 April 2015, Rustie announced the next North American leg of his Green Language World Tour. It included stops at a number of festivals with performances at Sasquatch, Bonnaroo, Firefly and Governors Ball.

At the beginning of November 2015, Rustie announced that his third album, Evenifudontbelieve, would be released on 5 November.  In his review in  The Fader, Selim Bulut wrote; "I want to join the cult of Rustie... On his new album EVENIFUDONTBELIEVE, the electronic producer has created a secular gospel. Is it possible to download someone’s consciousness as an album? I don't know if I believe in that, but I definitely believe in Rustie." Evenifudontbelieve was released via Warp Records, having made two of the singles taken from the album, "First Mythz" and "Peace Upzzz" available for stream only days prior to the release.

Late November 2015, saw Rustie take part in a live Q&A with fans on Reddit, answering questions on a range of subjects including his production techniques, his influences and previous collaborations.

After six years of silence, Sub Club hosted Rustie and other artists in collaboration with the Glasgow label, Numbers, on 2 December 2022.

Production
As well as his own material, Whyte has produced three tracks for Danny Brown's 2013 album Old.

Personal life
At the age of 15, Whyte was diagnosed with type 1 diabetes.

In the midst of Evenifudontbelieves release cycle and tour, Whyte announced that he would be cancelling all concerts "due to addiction and mental health problems".

Discography
Studio albums

EPs

Singles

"—" denotes single that did not chart.

Remixes
 "Spliff Dub" by Zomby on Mush / Spliff Dub (2008)
 "Another Day" by Jamie Lidell on Another Day (2008)
 "Let Me See What U Workin With" by Rod Lee on Let Me See What U Workin With (2008)
 "Drama" by Fool on Drama (2008)
 "In This" by Various Production on Versus (2008)
 "In The Blood" by Pivot on In The Blood (2008) 
 "The Black Block" by Modeselektor on Happy Birthday! Remixed #2 (2008)
 "No Security" by Crookers feat. Kelis on No Security (2009)
 "Ariel" by Stateless on Ninja Tune XX: 20 Years Of Beats & Pieces (2010)
 "Ariel" (Second version credited as 'Rustie's Pentagram Remake') by Stateless on Ninja Tune XX No. 1 (2010)
 "I'm Gone" by Lazer Sword on Lazer Sword (2010)
 "G41" by 8Bitch on G41 (2010)
 "Dominos" by The Big Pink on  Chysalis Music 2010 Coachella (2010)
 "Fancy Forty" by Lunice on Stacker Upper (2010)
 "On My Mind" by Joker on On My Mind (2011)
 "Brand New" by Gucci Mane (2011)
 "Lose Yourself" by Surkin on Lose Yourself (2012)
 "Love in Motion" by SebastiAn on Love in Motion (2012)
 "Ratchet" by Bloc Party on Four (Deluxe Edition)'' (2013)
 "Trouble on My Mind" by Pusha T feat. Tyler, the Creator via SoundCloud (2013)
 "Back Seat Ho" by Machinedrum (2014)
 "Beautiful" by A. G. Cook (2014)
 "Midnight" by Joker (2014)
 "Hit Da Blokk" by Big Dope P (2015)
 "Where Are Ü Now" by Jack Ü with Justin Bieber (2015)

References

External links
 Rustie at Warp Records
  
 Rustie at SoundCloud

Scottish electronic musicians
Scottish record producers
Warp (record label) artists
1983 births
Living people